Loryma itremoalis is a species of snout moth in the genus Loryma. It was described by Patrice J.A. Leraut in 2009 and is known from Madagascar.

References

Moths described in 2009
Pyralini
Moths of Madagascar